Henry Woodthorpe Sr. (1755 – 4 September, 1825) was Town Clerk of London from 15 December, 1801 until his death on 4 September, 1825. He was succeeded in the role by his son, Henry Woodthorpe Jr. His grandson Frederick Woodthorpe also filled the role from 10 February 1859 until 1873.

References

Town Clerks of London
1755 births
1825 deaths